Hungry Bentley is a civil parish in the Derbyshire Dales district of Derbyshire, England.  The parish contains two listed buildings that are recorded in the National Heritage List for England.  Of these, one is listed at Grade II*, the middle of the three grades, and the other is at Grade II, the lowest grade.  The parish, which contains a deserted medieval village, is entirely rural, and the listed buildings consist of a house, and a farmhouse with an attached outbuilding


Key

Buildings

References

Citations

Sources

 

Lists of listed buildings in Derbyshire